L.O. Daniel is a neighborhood in northern Oak Cliff, Dallas, Texas (USA).  It is named for Lark Owen Daniel.

The neighborhood is bounded by Hampton Road on the west, Jefferson Boulevard and Sunset Hills on the south, Rosemont Avenue and Winnetka Heights on the east and Davis Street (SH 180) and West Kessler on the north.  The Stevenswood annex includes Bison Trail and Stevens Woods Lane & Court to the east of Oak Cliff Boulevard.

References

External links 
 L.O. Daniel Neighborhood from the Old Oak Cliff Conservation League
 Photos of the L.O. Daniel Neighborhood from the Old Oak Cliff Conservation League